The Whitestone River is a river in New Zealand, a tributary of the Mararoa River.  It has been identified as an Important Bird Area by BirdLife International because it supports breeding colonies of the endangered black-billed gull.

See also
List of rivers of New Zealand

References

Rivers of Southland, New Zealand
Important Bird Areas of New Zealand
Rivers of New Zealand